Peter C. Harvey is an attorney who became the first African American to serve as New Jersey Attorney General. Harvey was appointed by New Jersey governor Jim McGreevey as acting attorney general on February 15, 2003, and was confirmed by the New Jersey Senate as attorney general on June 16, 2003. Harvey served until 2006, when he was succeeded by Zulima Farber. Following his resignation as attorney general, he became a partner in the New York City law office of Patterson, Belknap, Webb, and Tyler.

Harvey was one of the advisers to the National Football League in the league's 2017 personal conduct investigation of Dallas Cowboys running back Ezekiel Elliott. He has been designated by NFL Commissioner Roger Goodell to hear the NFL's appeal of the suspension of Deshaun Watson.

Biography
On January 17, 2002, then-attorney general David Samson appointed Harvey to serve as first assistant attorney general and director of the Division of Criminal Justice, where he served prior to his appointment as attorney general.

Harvey received his J.D. degree in 1982 from Columbia Law School. He received a B.A. in political science from Morgan State University in 1979.

References

External links
Peter C. Harvey, New Jersey Attorney General capsule bio
Columbia Law School: Peter C. Harvey '82
Attorney General Harvey to speak on New Jersey’s judicial response to sexual assault

Year of birth missing (living people)
Living people
Columbia Law School alumni
Morgan State University alumni
New Jersey Attorneys General
African-American lawyers
New Jersey Democrats
Patterson Belknap Webb & Tyler people
21st-century African-American people